Other People's Lives Are Not as Perfect as They Seem is the debut studio album by English rock band Cord. It was released on 2 October 2006 by Island Records.

Critical reception

Jim Butler from The Guardian disliked the album; "Deploying a similar sonic pomposity to Matt Bellamy's troupe (Muse), Other People's Lives is a resolutely leaden and dispiriting listen."

Track listing
"Go Either Way" - 3:15
"Sea of Trouble" - 3:51
"Eyes" - 3:54
"Winter" - 4:03
"Give Me Today" - 3:45
"Already Lost" - 6:47
"The Best Days of Our Lives" - 4:18
"Stay With Me Now" - 4:26
"Why I Want It" - 3:39
"The Greater Part" - 5:40

References

2006 debut albums
Island Records albums